Karsten, Re (Deceased) [1950] NZGazLawRp 92; [1950] NZLR 1022; (1950) 52 GLR 496 is a cited case in New Zealand regarding incorporation by reference.

References

High Court of New Zealand cases
1950 in New Zealand law